Hiraoka (written: 平岡) is a Japanese surname. Notable people with the surname include:

, Japanese samurai
, Japanese politician
, Japanese drifting driver
, Japanese judoka
, Japanese footballer
, Japanese writer, poet, playwright, actor and film director, better known as Yukio Mishima
, Japanese footballer and manager
, Japanese mayor
, Japanese snowboarder
, Japanese footballer
, Japanese footballer
, Japanese footballer
, Japanese actor

Japanese-language surnames